João Ernesto dos Santos is an Angolan politician and cabinet minister who is serving as Minister of National Defence and served as Governor of Moxico Province.

Personal life 
He was born in January 15, 1954.

References 

1954 births
Living people
Governors of Moxico
Angolan politicians